Angelfist is a 1993 martial arts action film starring Catya Sassoon, Michael Shaner, and Melissa Moore. Directed by Cirio H. Santiago, the film was produced by Santiago and Roger Corman.

The film has been described as a "reworking of T.N.T. Jackson".

Premise

In Manila, a United States colonel is killed by the Black Brigade, a terrorist group. A martial artist who witnesses the murder is also killed. Her sister, a Los Angeles detective, travels to Manila and fights in her stead in a martial arts tournament in order to find her killer and avenge her death.

Reception

In his book on martial arts in American cinema, M. Ray Lott said Catya Sassoon's role that in the "subgenre of the female martial artist", Angelfist was "much more interested in showing her as a sexual object" than would be the case in a film with Cynthia Rothrock, the usual figure in that subgenre. Her nude appearance resulted in her being "almost launched as soft-porn action heroine". Lott called the film itself "a titillating exploitation vehicle for undiscriminating action audiences" and acknowledged that "[i]t knows its target audience".

References

External links
  
 

1993 films
1993 action films
American action films
American martial arts films
American films about revenge
1990s English-language films
Taekwondo films
Kickboxing films
1993 martial arts films
Martial arts tournament films
Films directed by Cirio H. Santiago
1990s American films